A Simbi (also Cymbee, Sim'bi, pl. Bisimbi) is a water spirit in traditional Kongo spirituality. In Haitian Vodoun context, they are a large and diverse family of serpents known as loa.

Hoodoo 
In Central Africa's Kongo region, "...bisimbi inhabit rocks, gullies, streams, and pools, and are able to influence the fertility and well being of those living in the area." "What are bisimbi? They have other names, too. Some are called python, lightning gourd or calabash, mortar or a sort of pot. The explanation of their names is that they are water spirits (nkisi mia mamba). The names of some of these minkisi are: Na Kongo, Ma Nzanza, Nkondi and Londa. There is a significant amount of Kongo culture that continues today in the African American community, because 40 percentage of Africans taken during the transatlantic slave trade came from Central Africa's Congo Basin.

Simbi (Bisimbi, plural) spirits are also revered in the United States in the African American community in the practice of Hoodoo in the American South. Academic historians conducted research in the Gullah Geechee Nation and have found continued Central African spiritual practices. For example, some African American churches in the Southeast prayed to Kongo-derived simbi spirits during Baptism. "Baptism also had a distinctly African side to it. The nineteenth century Georgia practice of praying to Kongo-derived simbi spirits before immersion demonstrates this aspect of an other wise Christian rite."

Academic research on the Pooshee Plantation and Woodboo Plantation in South Carolina, showed a continued belief of African water spirits among enslaved African Americans. Both plantations are "now under the waters of Lake Moultrie." The earliest known record of simbi spirits was recorded in the nineteenth century by Edmund Ruffin who was a wealthy slaveholder from Virginia, and traveled to South Carolina "to keep the slave economic system viable through agricultural reform." In Ruffin's records he spelled simbi, cymbee, because he did not know the original spelling of the word. "At Pooshee plantation on the Santee Canal not too far from Woodboo, Ruffin stated that a young slave boy went to a fountain for water late at night and was very frightened by a cymbee [Simbi water spirit] who was running around and around the fountain. Although few witnesses to the appearance of cymbees were found by Ruffin, he stated that they are generally believed by the slaves to be frequent and numerous. Part of the superstition was that it was bad luck for anyone who saw one to 'tell of the occurrence, or refer to it; and that his death would be the certain penalty, if he told of the meeting for some weeks afterwards." Another occurrence from an enslaved man said simbi spirits have long hair.

Sukey and The Mermaid 

In African-American folklore, the Gullah Geechee people in the Carolina Lowcountry have a children's story called Sukey and the Mermaid about a girl named Sukey meeting a mermaid named Mama Jo. Mama Jo in the story helps and protects Sukey and financially supported her by giving her gold coins. This story comes from the belief in Simbi spirits in West-Central Africa that came to the United States during the trans-atlantic slave trade. In Africa, Simbi nature spirits protect and provide riches to their followers. In West-Central Africa, there are folk stories of people meeting mermaids.

Haitian Vodou 
Vodou traditions were practiced by Haitians who came from Africa: the religious traditions were handed down. The Vodou religion believes in a creator who cannot be easily reached, so Vodou worshipers contact spirits which act as go-betweens between the creator and the worshiper. Some names for the Simbi loa include Simbi Dlo (also Simbi d'l'eau - Simbi of the water), Simbi Makaya, Simbi Andezo (Simbi of two waters), and Gran Simba. They have wide-ranging associations. For example, Simbi Makaya is a great sorcerer and served in particular in the Sanpwel secret societies. Simbi Anpaka is a loa of plants, leaves, and poisons. Simbi is a loa which represents magic. Simbi is portrayed as a snake. This loa is used to contact the dead.

Palo
In this Afro-Cuban religion, Simbi are called Nkitas. They are gods of all aspects of nature : lakes, forests or mountains, for example.

In culture
Governor General Michaëlle Jean of Canada, who was born in Haiti, bears two simbi serpents as supporters on her coat of arms.

See also
 Hoodoo
 Kongo religion
 West African Vodun
 Haitian mythology
 Juju
 Witch doctor

References

Further reading
 The Haitian Vodou Handbook: Protocols for Riding with the Lwa by Kenaz Filan, Inner Traditions (2006)
 Voodoo and Afro-Caribbean Paganism by Lilith Dorsey, Kensington Publishing (2005)
 The drum and the hoe: Life and lore of the Haitian people by Harold Courlander, University of California Press (1960)

Haitian Vodou gods
Water gods
Magic gods